Classic Park is a stadium in Eastlake, Ohio, in suburban Cleveland. It is primarily used for baseball, and is the home field of the Lake County Captains minor league baseball team. It was built in 2003 at a cost of $22 million under the name Eastlake Park and holds 7,273 people.

Although not immediately apparent to non-locals, the stadium bears a corporate name. The naming rights were purchased by Classic Automotive Group, a large Cleveland-area chain of auto dealerships.

Financing
In order to construct Classic Park, Eastlake, Ohio assumed $1 million in debt. This debt necessitated cuts in public services, including the laying off of five police officers and a reduction in the scope of police services.

Features
The field was voted as the Best Playing Surface in the South Atlantic League in 2003, 2004 and 2007. Other features include a 4,000-square foot indoor batting facility with two full-sized batting cages. The main clubhouse building is located beyond the right-field corner and houses both the Captains and visiting teams. Each clubhouse features offices for the manager and coaching staff, a training room, and laundry facilities.

The ballpark and playing field are available for rent to area businesses and baseball leagues. Many organizations play games at the stadium during the year and the team operates a fundraising program enabling teams to play games there and make money for their organization at the same time.

The stadium features two large party tents which can accommodate up to 500 guests in each one. In addition, there are two private Party Decks located on the suite level which can hold up to 60 people in each one. The park also features 20 party suites which can be rented for the season, half-season, quarter-season or on a game-by-game basis. The suite level also features a full-service bar and an oversized private party suite called The Officer's Club.

References

External links
 About Classic Park
 Classic Park Views - Ball Parks of the Minor Leagues

Buildings and structures in Lake County, Ohio
Minor league baseball venues
Baseball venues in Ohio

2003 establishments in Ohio
Midwest League ballparks